Touho Airport is an airport in Touho, New Caledonia .

Airlines and destinations

References

Airports in New Caledonia